Ben Arnold (July 30, 1936 – March 20, 2011) was an American professional stock car racing driver. He was a driver in the NASCAR Winston Cup Series from 1968 to 1973.

References

External links
 
 

1936 births
2011 deaths
American racing drivers
NASCAR drivers